The 2003–04 Edmonton Oilers season was the Oilers' 25th season in the NHL, and they were coming off a 36–26–11–9 record in 2002–03, earning 92 points, and returned to the playoffs after a one-year absence.  The Oilers were then defeated by the Dallas Stars in six games in the opening round.

During the off-season, the Oilers and Mike Comrie could not come to a contract agreement, and Comrie would not start the season with the team.  Comrie would eventually be traded to the Philadelphia Flyers in December for Jeff Woywitka and the Flyers' first-round draft pick in 2004.

The club would start off the season on the right foot, having a record of 10–7–2–0 in the first 19 games. However, Edmonton would go into a slump and have a 10–17–6–1 in their next 34 games, falling to 12th place in the Western Conference. The Oilers would later emerge from the slump and finish the season with a 16–5–4–4 in their remaining 29 games. Despite the season turnaround, the Oilers would finish in ninth in the West, two points behind the eighth-placed Nashville Predators for the final playoff spot, thereby failing to qualify for the post-season for the second time in three seasons.

Offensively, Ryan Smyth would lead the club with 23 goals, 36 assists and 59 points. Radek Dvorak would finish just behind Smyth with 50 points, while Ethan Moreau and Raffi Torres would each score 20 goals.  Marc-Andre Bergeron would lead the defense with 9 goals and 26 points, while Eric Brewer would finish just behind him with seven goals and 25 points. Georges Laraque would lead the club in penalty minutes, with 99.

In goal, Tommy Salo would begin the season as the starter. However, he would lose his job and eventually be traded to the Colorado Avalanche before the season was over. He won 17 games and had a 2.58 goals against average (GAA), along with three shutouts, with Edmonton. Ty Conklin took over the starting duties, where he would win 17 games, attain a 2.42 GAA and earn a shutout along the way.

Heritage Classic

The Heritage Classic was an outdoor ice hockey game played on November 22, 2003, in Edmonton between the Edmonton Oilers and the Montreal Canadiens. It was the second NHL outdoor game and the first regular season outdoor game in the history of the NHL, and was modeled after the success of the "cold war" game between the University of Michigan and Michigan State University in 2001. The first NHL game to be played outdoors was in 1991 when the Los Angeles Kings played the New York Rangers in an exhibition game outside Caesars Palace in Las Vegas. The event took place in Edmonton's Commonwealth Stadium in front of a crowd of 57,167, the largest number of people to ever watch a live NHL game, despite temperatures of close to -18 °C, -30 °C (-22 °F) with wind chill. It was held to commemorate the 25th anniversary of the Edmonton Oilers joining the NHL in 1979.  The Canadian Broadcasting Corporation television broadcast also set the record for most viewers of a single NHL game with 2.747 million nationwide. This was the first NHL game broadcast in HDTV on CBC. Montreal won the game 4–3.

Season standings

Schedule and results

|-  style="text-align:center; background:#cfc;"
| 1 || October 9 || San Jose Sharks || 2 – 5 || Edmonton Oilers || || Salo || 16,839 || 1–0–0–0 || 2 || 
|-  style="text-align:center; background:#fbb;"
| 2 || October 11 || Edmonton Oilers || 0 – 3 || Vancouver Canucks || || Salo || 18,630 || 1–1–0–0 || 2 || 
|-  style="text-align:center; background:#fbb;"
| 3 || October 14 || Edmonton Oilers || 0 – 1 || Calgary Flames || || Salo || 16,009 || 1–2–0–0 || 2 || 
|-  style="text-align:center; background:#cfc;"
| 4 || October 16 || Buffalo Sabres || 1 – 4 || Edmonton Oilers || || Conklin || 15,502 || 2–2–0–0 || 4 || 
|-  style="text-align:center; background:#cfc;"
| 5 || October 18 || Colorado Avalanche || 3 – 6 || Edmonton Oilers || || Salo || 16,839 || 3–2–0–0 || 6 || 
|-  style="text-align:center; background:#fbb;"
| 6 || October 21 || St. Louis Blues || 6 – 4 || Edmonton Oilers || || Salo || 16,043 || 3–3–0–0 || 6 || 
|-  style="text-align:center; background:#fbb;"
| 7 || October 23 || Edmonton Oilers || 1 – 6 || Colorado Avalanche || || Conklin || 18,007 || 3–4–0–0 || 6 || 
|-  style="text-align:center; background:#fbb;"
| 8 || October 25 || Calgary Flames || 4 – 2 || Edmonton Oilers || || Salo || 16,839 || 3–5–0–0 || 6 || 
|-  style="text-align:center; background:#cfc;"
| 9 || October 30 || Columbus Blue Jackets || 3 – 4 || Edmonton Oilers || OT || Salo || 15,946 || 4–5–0–0 || 8 || 
|-

|-  style="text-align:center; background:white;"
| 10 || November 1 || Detroit Red Wings || 4 – 4 || Edmonton Oilers || OT || Salo || 16,839 || 4–5–1–0 || 9 || 
|-  style="text-align:center; background:#cfc;"
| 11 || November 4 || Edmonton Oilers || 4 – 2 || Montreal Canadiens || || Salo || 18,218 || 5–5–1–0 || 11 || 
|-  style="text-align:center; background:white;"
| 12 || November 6 || Edmonton Oilers || 3 – 3 || Ottawa Senators || OT || Salo || 15,216 || 5–5–2–0 || 12 || 
|-  style="text-align:center; background:#fbb;"
| 13 || November 8 || Edmonton Oilers || 1 – 4 || Toronto Maple Leafs || || Salo || 19,340 || 5–6–2–0 || 12 || 
|-  style="text-align:center; background:#cfc;"
| 14 || November 10 || Edmonton Oilers || 5 – 4 || New York Rangers || || Conklin || 17,887 || 6–6–2–0 || 14 || 
|-  style="text-align:center; background:#fbb;"
| 15 || November 11 || Edmonton Oilers || 3 – 4 || Boston Bruins || || Conklin || 12,456 || 6–7–2–0 || 14 || 
|-  style="text-align:center; background:#cfc;"
| 16 || November 13 || Edmonton Oilers || 2 – 0 || Minnesota Wild || || Conklin || 18,568 || 7–7–2–0 || 16 || 
|-  style="text-align:center; background:#cfc;"
| 17 || November 15 || Calgary Flames || 1 – 2 || Edmonton Oilers || OT || Conklin || 16,839 || 8–7–2–0 || 18 || 
|-  style="text-align:center; background:#cfc;"
| 18 || November 18 || Chicago Blackhawks || 2 – 5 || Edmonton Oilers || || Conklin || 16,839 || 9–7–2–0 || 20 || 
|-  style="text-align:center; background:#cfc;"
| 19 || November 20 || Toronto Maple Leafs || 2 – 3 || Edmonton Oilers || || Conklin || 16,839 || 10–7–2–0 || 22 || 
|-  style="text-align:center; background:#fbb;"
| 20 || November 22 || Montreal Canadiens|| 4 – 3 || Edmonton Oilers || || Conklin || 57,167 || 10–8–2–0 || 22 || 
|-  style="text-align:center; background:white;"
| 21 || November 25 || Edmonton Oilers || 3 – 3 || Columbus Blue Jackets || OT || Conklin || 16,465 || 10–8–3–0 || 23 || 
|-  style="text-align:center; background:#fbb;"
| 22 || November 26 || Edmonton Oilers || 1 – 7 || Detroit Red Wings || || Conklin || 20,066 || 10–9–3–0 || 23 || 
|-  style="text-align:center; background:#fbb;"
| 23 || November 28 || Colorado Avalanche || 4 – 1 || Edmonton Oilers || || Conklin || 16,839 || 10–10–3–0 || 23 || 
|-  style="text-align:center; background:#fbb;"
| 24 || November 30 || San Jose Sharks || 2 – 1 || Edmonton Oilers || || Conklin || 16,839 || 10–11–3–0 || 23 || 
|-

|-  style="text-align:center; background:#fbb;"
| 25 || December 3 || Minnesota Wild || 1 – 0 || Edmonton Oilers || || Conklin || 16,198 || 10–12–3–0 || 23 || 
|-  style="text-align:center; background:#cfc;"
| 26 || December 6 || Pittsburgh Penguins || 3 – 4 || Edmonton Oilers || || Conklin || 16,839 || 11–12–3–0 || 25 || 
|-  style="text-align:center; background:#fbb;"
| 27 || December 9 || Carolina Hurricanes || 3 – 2 || Edmonton Oilers || || Salo || 16,179 || 11–13–3–0 || 25 || 
|-  style="text-align:center; background:#white;"
| 28 || December 11 || Edmonton Oilers || 2 – 2 || San Jose Sharks || OT || Conklin || 14,853 || 11–13–4–0 || 26 || 
|-  style="text-align:center; background:white;"
| 29 || December 12 || Edmonton Oilers || 3 – 3 || Phoenix Coyotes || OT || Salo || 13,609 || 11–13–5–0 || 27 || 
|-  style="text-align:center; background:#cfc;"
| 30 || December 14 || Edmonton Oilers || 3 – 2 || Mighty Ducks of Anaheim || || Conklin || 12,426 || 12–13–5–0 || 29 || 
|-  style="text-align:center; background:#fbb;"
| 31 || December 16 || Edmonton Oilers || 2 – 4 || Los Angeles Kings || || Salo || 18,118 || 12–14–5–0 || 29 || 
|-  style="text-align:center; background:white;"
| 32 || December 18 || Minnesota Wild || 1 – 1 || Edmonton Oilers || OT || Conklin || 16,145 || 12–14–6–0 || 30 || 
|-  style="text-align:center; background:#fbb;"
| 33 || December 20 || Vancouver Canucks || 3 – 0 || Edmonton Oilers || || Conklin ||| 16,839 || 12–15–6–0 || 30 || 
|-  style="text-align:center; background:#fbb;"
| 34 || December 23 || Edmonton Oilers || 1 – 2 || Calgary Flames || || Salo || 18,389 || 12–16–6–0 || 30 || 
|-  style="text-align:center; background:#cfc;"
| 35 || December 27 || Edmonton Oilers || 6 – 2 || Vancouver Canucks || || Salo || 18,630 || 13–16–6–0 || 32 || 
|-  style="text-align:center; background:#fbb;"
| 36 || December 28 || Calgary Flames || 2 – 1 || Edmonton Oilers || || Salo || 16,839 || 13–17–6–0 || 32 || 
|-  style="text-align:center; background:white;"
| 37 || December 30 || Minnesota Wild || 2 – 2 || Edmonton Oilers || OT || Salo || 16,839 || 13–17–7–0 || 33 || 
|-

|-  style="text-align:center; background:#cfc;"
| 38 || January 2 || Edmonton Oilers || 2 – 1 || Minnesota Wild || || Salo || 18,568 || 14–17–7–0 || 35 || 
|-  style="text-align:center; background:#cfc;"
| 39 || January 4 || Edmonton Oilers || 4 – 3 || Chicago Blackhawks || || Salo || 10,101 || 15–17–7–0 || 37 || 
|-  style="text-align:center; background:#ffb;"
| 40 || January 5 || Edmonton Oilers || 2 – 3 || New Jersey Devils || OT || Salo || 11,724 || 15–17–7–1 || 38 || 
|-  style="text-align:center; background:#fbb;"
| 41 || January 8 || Edmonton Oilers || 2 – 3 || New York Islanders || || Conklin || 11,087 || 15–18–7–1 || 38 || 
|-  style="text-align:center; background:#cfc;"
| 42 || January 10 || Edmonton Oilers || 3 – 0 || Philadelphia Flyers || || Salo || 19,561 || 16–18–7–1 || 40 || 
|-  style="text-align:center; background:#fbb;"
| 43 || January 11 || Edmonton Oilers || 0 – 1 || Washington Capitals || || Salo || 12,704 || 16–19–7–1 || 40 || 
|-  style="text-align:center; background:#cfc;"
| 44 || January 13 || Florida Panthers || 2 – 4 || Edmonton Oilers || || Salo || 16,839 || 17–19–7–1 || 42 || 
|-  style="text-align:center; background:#cfc;"
| 45 || January 15 || Mighty Ducks of Anaheim || 0 – 1 || Edmonton Oilers || || Salo || 16,839 || 18–19–7–1 || 44 || 
|-  style="text-align:center; background:#fbb;"
| 46 || January 17 || Edmonton Oilers || 1 – 2 || Nashville Predators || || Salo || 15,861 || 18–20–7–1 || 44 || 
|-  style="text-align:center; background:white;"
| 47 || January 18 || Edmonton Oilers || 4 – 4 || Columbus Blue Jackets || OT || Conklin || 18,136 || 18–20–8–1 || 45 || 
|-  style="text-align:center; background:#cfc;"
| 48 || January 20 || Dallas Stars || 0 – 3 || Edmonton Oilers || || Salo || 16,839 || 19–20–8–1 || 47 || 
|-  style="text-align:center; background:#fbb;"
| 49 || January 22 || Tampa Bay Lightning || 3 – 2 || Edmonton Oilers || || Salo || 16,839 || 19–21–8–1 || 47 || 
|-  style="text-align:center; background:#fbb;"
| 50 || January 24 || Nashville Predators || 4 – 3 || Edmonton Oilers || || Salo || 16,839 || 19–22–8–1 || 47 || 
|-  style="text-align:center; background:#fbb;"
| 51 || January 27 || Edmonton Oilers || 1 – 3 || Colorado Avalanche || || Conklin || 18,007 || 19–23–8–1 || 47 || 
|-  style="text-align:center; background:#cfc;"
| 52 || January 29 || Chicago Blackhawks || 2 – 5 || Edmonton Oilers || || Salo || 16,839 || 20–23–8–1 || 49 || 
|-  style="text-align:center; background:#fbb;"
| 53 || January 31 || Los Angeles Kings || 4 – 3 || Edmonton Oilers || || Salo || 16,839 || 20–24–8–1 || 49 || 
|-

|-  style="text-align:center; background:#cfc;"
| 54 || February 2 || Mighty Ducks of Anaheim || 1 – 2 || Edmonton Oilers || OT || Conklin || 16,183 || 21–24–8–1 || 51 || 
|-  style="text-align:center; background:#cfc;"
| 55 || February 4 || St. Louis Blues || 3 – 5 || Edmonton Oilers || || Conklin || 16,569 || 22–24–8–1 || 53 || 
|-  style="text-align:center; background:#cfc;"
| 56 || February 11 || Atlanta Thrashers || 1 – 5 || Edmonton Oilers || || Conklin || 16,839 || 23–24–8–1 || 55 || 
|-  style="text-align:center; background:#fbb;"
| 57 || February 13 || Edmonton Oilers || 0 – 3 || Minnesota Wild || || Conklin || 18,568 || 23–25–8–1 || 55 || 
|-  style="text-align:center; background:white;"
| 58 || February 15 || Edmonton Oilers || 2 – 2 || Nashville Predators || || Salo || 14,276 || 23–25–9–1 || 56 || 
|-  style="text-align:center; background:#fbb;"
| 59 || February 16 || Edmonton Oilers || 1 – 2 || Detroit Red Wings || || Salo || 20,066 || 23–26–9–1 || 56 || 
|-  style="text-align:center; background:#cfc;"
| 60 || February 18 || Edmonton Oilers || 5 – 1 || Colorado Avalanche || || Salo || 18,007 || 24–26–9–1 || 58 || 
|-  style="text-align:center; background:#cfc;"
| 61 || February 21 || Vancouver Canucks || 3 – 4 || Edmonton Oilers || OT || Salo || 16,839 || 25–26–9–1 || 60 || 
|-  style="text-align:center; background:white;"
| 62 || February 23 || Detroit Red Wings || 1 – 1 || Edmonton Oilers || OT || Salo || 16,839 || 25–26–10–1 || 61 || 
|-  style="text-align:center; background:#fbb;"
| 63 || February 25 || Edmonton Oilers || 2 – 4 || Mighty Ducks of Anaheim || || Salo || 15,235 || 25–27–10–1 || 61 || 
|-  style="text-align:center; background:#cfc;"
| 64 || February 27 || Edmonton Oilers || 7 – 2 || Phoenix Coyotes || || Salo || 16,721 || 26–27–10–1 || 63 || 
|-  style="text-align:center; background:#ffb;"
| 65 || February 29 || Edmonton Oilers || 4 – 5 || Dallas Stars || OT || Salo || 18,257 || 26–27–10–2 || 64 || 
|-

|-  style="text-align:center; background:#cfc;"
| 66 || March 2 || Phoenix Coyotes || 4 – 5 || Edmonton Oilers || OT || Salo || 16,839 || 27–27–10–2 || 66 || 
|-  style="text-align:center; background:white;"
| 67 || March 4 || Edmonton Oilers || 1 – 1 || St. Louis Blues || OT || Markkanen || 16,559 || 27–27–11–2 || 67 || 
|-  style="text-align:center; background:#cfc;"
| 68 || March 7 || Edmonton Oilers || 4 – 3 || Chicago Blackhawks || OT || Salo || 12,839 || 28–27–11–2 || 69 || 
|-  style="text-align:center; background:white;"
| 69 || March 9 || Edmonton Oilers || 1 – 1 || Calgary Flames || OT || Markkanen || 18,479 || 28–27–12–2 || 70 || 
|-  style="text-align:center; background:#ffb;"
| 70 || March 10 || Colorado Avalanche || 3 – 2 || Edmonton Oilers || OT || Conklin || 16,839 || 28–27–12–3 || 71 || 
|-  style="text-align:center; background:#ffb;"
| 71 || March 12 || Vancouver Canucks || 4 – 3 || Edmonton Oilers || OT || Markkanen || 16,839 || 28–27–12–4 || 72 || 
|-  style="text-align:center; background:#cfc;"
| 72 || March 14 || Ottawa Senators || 1 – 3 || Edmonton Oilers || || Conklin || 16,839 || 29–27–12–4 || 74 || 
|-  style="text-align:center; background:#cfc;"
| 73 || March 16 || Columbus Blue Jackets || 2 – 3 || Edmonton Oilers || || Conklin || 16,839 || 30–27–12–4 || 76 || 
|-  style="text-align:center; background:#cfc;"
| 74 || March 19 || Nashville Predators || 4 – 5 || Edmonton Oilers || || Conklin || 16,839 || 31–27–12–4 || 78 || 
|-  style="text-align:center; background:#cfc;"
| 75 || March 21 || Edmonton Oilers || 5 – 2 || San Jose Sharks || || Markkanen || 16,176 || 32–27–12–4 || 80 || 
|-  style="text-align:center; background:#cfc;"
| 76 || March 22 || Edmonton Oilers || 2 – 1 || Los Angeles Kings || || Conklin || 18,118 || 33–27–12–4 || 82 || 
|-  style="text-align:center; background:#ffb;"
| 77 || March 24 || Dallas Stars || 4 – 3 || Edmonton Oilers || OT || Conklin || 16,839 || 33–27–12–5 || 83 || 
|-  style="text-align:center; background:#cfc;"
| 78 || March 26 || Los Angeles Kings || 1 – 3 || Edmonton Oilers || || Conklin || 16,839 || 34–27–12–5 || 85 || 
|-  style="text-align:center; background:#cfc;"
| 79 || March 28 || Phoenix Coyotes || 2 – 4 || Edmonton Oilers || || Markkanen || 16,839 || 35–27–12–5 || 87 || 
|-  style="text-align:center; background:#fbb;"
| 80 || March 30 || Edmonton Oilers || 0 – 1 || St. Louis Blues || || Markkanen || 19,646 || 35–28–12–5 || 87 || 
|-  style="text-align:center; background:#cfc;"
| 81 || March 31 || Edmonton Oilers || 3 – 1 || Dallas Stars || || Markkanen || 18,532 || 36–28–12–5 || 89 || 
|-

|-  style="text-align:center; background:#fbb;"
| 82 || April 3 || Edmonton Oilers || 2 – 5 || Vancouver Canucks || || Conklin || 18,680 || 36–29–12–5 || 89 || 
|-

|-
| Legend:

Player statistics

Scoring
 Position abbreviations: C = Centre; D = Defence; G = Goaltender; LW = Left Wing; RW = Right Wing
  = Joined team via a transaction (e.g., trade, waivers, signing) during the season. Stats reflect time with the Oilers only.
  = Left team via a transaction (e.g., trade, waivers, release) during the season. Stats reflect time with the Oilers only.

Goaltending
  = Joined team via a transaction (e.g., trade, waivers, signing) during the season. Stats reflect time with the Oilers only.
  = Left team via a transaction (e.g., trade, waivers, release) during the season. Stats reflect time with the Oilers only.

Awards and records

Awards

Milestones

Transactions
The Oilers were involved in the following transactions from June 10, 2003, the day after the deciding game of the 2003 Stanley Cup Finals, through June 7, 2004, the day of the deciding game of the 2004 Stanley Cup Finals.

Trades

Players acquired

Players lost

Signings

Draft picks
Edmonton's draft picks at the 2003 NHL Entry Draft held at the Gaylord Entertainment Center in Nashville, Tennessee.

Notes

References

 
 
 National Hockey League Guide & Record Book 2007

Edmonton Oilers season, 2003-04
Edmon
Edmonton Oilers seasons